Veil of Ignorance is the fifth studio album by Swedish hardcore punk band, Raised Fist. It was released in September, 2009 on Burning Heart Records. In December 2012, The Pirate Bay featured the music video for "Friends and Traitors" on its website.

Track listing
 All songs written by Raised Fist
"Friends and Traitors" – 3:13
"They Can't Keep Us Down" – 2:09
"Wounds" – 2:59
"Afraid" – 2:10
"Slipping Into Coma" – 2:39
"City of Cold" – 3:13
"Volcano Is Me" – 3:39
"Disbelief" – 2:41
"My Last Day" – 3:00
"I Have to Pretend" – 2:38
"Words and Phrases" – 4:24
"Keeping It to Yourself" – 1:36
"Never Negotiate" – 3:11
"Out" – 4:01

Charts

Credits
 Alexander "Alle" Hagman – vocals
 Marco Eronen – guitar
 Daniel Holmberg – guitar
 Andreas "Josse" Johansson – bass
 Matte Modin – drums
 Produced by Daniel Bergstrand, Raised Fist, Örjan Örnkloo, and Erik Sjölander
 Recorded at Studio DugOut and Misty Studios between 13 April and 26 May 2009

References

2009 albums
Raised Fist albums
Burning Heart Records albums